Charles Stanley Albeck (May 17, 1931 – March 25, 2021) was an American professional basketball coach. Albeck coached for several teams in the American Basketball Association (ABA) and National Basketball Association (NBA), including the Denver Rockets, the San Diego Conquistadors, (often subbing for an absent Wilt Chamberlain), the Cleveland Cavaliers, the San Antonio Spurs, the New Jersey Nets, and the Chicago Bulls.

Early life
Albeck was born in Chenoa, Illinois, on May 17, 1931.  He attended Chenoa High School in his hometown.  He subsequently obtained a bachelor's degree at Bradley University in 1955 and his master's at Michigan State University in 1957.

Coaching career
Albeck began his coaching at Adrian College in Adrian, Michigan.  His next head coaching job was at Northern Michigan University. Albeck was head coach at the University of Denver from 1968 to 1970. He was the head coach of the Denver Rockets during most of the 1970–1971 season. The Rockets had begun the season under head coach Joe Belmont, but Belmont was fired after the team lost 10 of its first 13 games. Albeck replaced Belmont as the Rockets' head coach.  The Rockets went 27–44 under Albeck to finish the season with a record of 30 wins and 54 losses. They tied the Texas Chaparrals for fourth place in the Western Division (28 games behind the Indiana Pacers) and on April 1, 1971 lost a one-game playoff to the Chaparrals, 115–109, to determine who would advance into the ABA Western Division semifinals.  During the season Denver's average home attendance dropped to 4,139 fans per game from 6,281 the year before.  One week after the playoff loss, on April 8, 1971, Albeck was replaced by Alex Hannum as Denver's head coach. Hannum resigned as coach of the San Diego Rockets to become the Rockets' head coach, general manager and president. Albeck then became player personnel director for the Rockets. During the 1972–1973 season Albeck was an assistant coach for the San Diego Conquistadors under head coach K.C. Jones. Albeck also served as director of player personnel for the Conquistadors. During most of the 1973–74 season, he served under 'Qs' head coach Wilt Chamberlain.  Chamberlain missed a few games, during which Albeck filled in as the Conquistadors' head coach, winning all of them.

Albeck was an assistant coach for the Kentucky Colonels during the 1974–1975 season in which the team won the 1975 ABA Championship.  He returned as an assistant coach with the Colonels during their final season in 1975–1976.  Albeck served as assistant coach of the Los Angeles Lakers from 1976 until 1979.  He went on to become head coach of the Cleveland Cavaliers from 1979 to 1980.  He was the San Antonio Spurs' head coach for three seasons from 1980 to 1983.  During his tenure, he won NBA Coach of the Month in March 1983.  After the Spurs job, Albeck was the head coach of the New Jersey Nets from 1983 until 1985.

Albeck subsequently served as head coach of the Chicago Bulls for one season.  He and general manager Jerry Krause immediately butted heads over issues including his refusal to put Phil Jackson on his coaching staff, not benching Quintin Dailey for conduct issues, and most of all, not following the minutes restrictions set once Michael Jordan returned from injury. His exit from Chicago raised eyebrows around the NBA as his replacement, Doug Collins, had been hired by general manager Jerry Krause just 2 months beforehand as a scout.  The hire of Collins was kept a secret from Albeck, who was "stunned" by the move and felt that there was "a lack of respect, dignity and sensitivity".  At the time of his dismissal, he had the fourth-best record among active NBA coaches.  His all-time coaching percentages was .535 in his 7 years as a head coach in the NBA.

Albeck went on to serve as head coach for Bradley University, his alma mater, from 1986 through 1991.  During his tenure, the team finished the 1988 regular season in first place.  They were also champions of the Missouri Valley Conference tournament and advanced to the NCAA tournament that same year.  Albeck was a member of the Sigma Chi Fraternity, as well as a Significant Sig and a member of their Significant Sig Hall of Fame.  

After serving as an assistant coach for the Atlanta Hawks, Albeck was an assistant coach for the Toronto Raptors.  He suffered a debilitating stroke in December 2001, approximately half an hour before a home game against the Miami Heat.  This left him partially paralyzed and forced him to retire.  He remained in rehabilitation until his death.  He often attended games at AT&T Center with his son.

Personal life
Albeck married Phyllis L. Mann in 1952.  Together, they had five children.  They remained married until her death in 2017.

Shortly after being placed in hospice care, Albeck died March 25, 2021, at the age of 89.  He had suffered a stroke two weeks prior to his death.

Head coaching record

NBA

|-
| align="left" |CLE
| align="left" |
|82||37||45||.451|| align="center" |4th in Central||—||—||—||—
| align="center" |Missed Playoffs
|-
| align="left" |SAS
| align="left" |
|82||52||30||.634|| align="center" |1st in Midwest||7||3||4||.429
| align="center" |Lost in Conf. semifinals
|-
| align="left" |SAS
| align="left" |
|82||48||34||.585|| align="center" |1st in Midwest||9||4||5||444
| align="center" |Lost in Conf. Finals
|-
| align="left" |SAS
| align="left" |
|82||53||29||.646|| align="center" |1st in Midwest||11||6||5||.545
| align="center" |Lost in Conf. Finals
|-
| align="left" |NJN
| align="left" |
|82||45||37||.549|| align="center" |4th in Atlantic||11||5||6||.455
| align="center" |Lost in Conf. semifinals
|-
| align="left" |NJN
| align="left" |
|82||42||40||.512|| align="center" |3rd in Atlantic||3||0||3||.000
| align="center" |Lost in first round
|-
| align="left" |CHI
| align="left" |
|82||30||52||.366|| align="center" |4th in Central||3||0||3||.000
| align="center" |Lost in first round
|-class="sortbottom"
| align="left" |Career
| ||574||307||267||.535|| ||44||18||26||.409

Source:

References

External links
 BasketballReference.com: Stan Albeck
 College playing statistics

1931 births
2021 deaths
Adrian Bulldogs men's basketball coaches
American Basketball Association executives
American expatriate basketball people in Canada
American men's basketball coaches
American men's basketball players
Atlanta Hawks assistant coaches
Basketball coaches from Illinois
Basketball players from Illinois
Bradley Braves men's basketball coaches
Bradley Braves men's basketball players
Chicago Bulls head coaches
Cleveland Cavaliers head coaches
College men's basketball head coaches in the United States
Denver Pioneers men's basketball coaches
Denver Rockets head coaches
Guards (basketball)
Kentucky Colonels coaches
Los Angeles Lakers assistant coaches
Michigan State University alumni
New Jersey Nets assistant coaches
New Jersey Nets head coaches
Northern Michigan Wildcats men's basketball coaches
People from Chenoa, Illinois
San Antonio Spurs head coaches
San Diego Conquistadors coaches
San Diego Conquistadors executives
Toronto Raptors assistant coaches